Sanctimommy is a portmanteau of two words, sanctimonious and mommy. The word is a colloquialism used to refer to a person, usually a female, who has very opinionated views on child rearing and presents them upfront without any sense of humility.

Occurrence
Generally speaking the word has been used in the blogosphere, to refer to people who give their opinions in a fashion that provokes anger, and seems to be condescending.

References

External links
 Washingtontimes.com
 Nytimes.com
 Svmoms.com
 Lawyermama.blogspot.com

Colloquial terms
Motherhood
Parenting